SSAWS, pronounced  and officially known as , was an indoor ski slope in Funabashi, Chiba, Japan. The name was an acronym of "Spring Summer Autumn Winter Snow".

Constructed by Mitsui at a cost of US$400 million, the ski slope opened on July 15, 1993. With a structural height of 100 meters (translating to a skiable vertical drop of 80 m), a width of 100 m and a length of 500 m, it was the largest indoor ski slope in the world at the time. The complex had three ski courses—20.1° for skilled skiers, 15° for intermediate, and 10° for beginners — and two ski lifts.

The ski slope was designed to break even by 2018 by attracting 1.3 million visitors yearly, who would pay ¥4,300 (~US$50) for 2 hours of lift time and spend a total of $70 on average. However, the opening of the ski slope came shortly after the end of the Japanese asset price bubble, and original estimates soon proved too optimistic, with the number of visitors dropping from one million in the first year to 700,000 in the second. With an annual operating cost of US$40 million, SSAWS sustained losses averaging US$16.7 million/year.

SSAWS closed on September 30, 2002. In 2003, the structure was demolished to make way for Japan's first large-format IKEA store, which opened on the site on April 24, 2006.

References

External links

Webcam captures from inside the complex on www.indoorsnow.com

Ssaws
Ssaws
Ssaws
Ssaws
Sports venues in Chiba Prefecture
1993 establishments in Japan
Buildings and structures demolished in 2003
Funabashi
Defunct sports venues in Japan